David Quirke (11 January 1947 – 1 November 2019) was an Irish former professional football player.  He spent his entire professional career with Gillingham in England, where he made over 200 Football League appearances.

References

Republic of Ireland association footballers
Gillingham F.C. players
Chelmsford City F.C. players
Canterbury City F.C. players
1947 births
2019 deaths
Cray Wanderers F.C. players
Folkestone F.C. players
St Neots Town F.C. players
Association footballers from County Mayo
People from Ballina, County Mayo
Association football midfielders